Bethlehem Township, Ohio, may refer to:

Bethlehem Township, Stark County, Ohio
Bethlehem Township, Coshocton County, Ohio

Ohio township disambiguation pages